Pigdon is a hamlet and former civil parish  from Morpeth, now in the parish of Meldon, in the county of Northumberland, England. In 1951 the parish had a population of 52.

History 
The name "Pigdon" may mean 'Pica's valley', or 'pointed hill valley'. The surname derives from the place. Pigdon was "Pikedenn" in 1205 and "Pykeden" in 1242. Pigdon was a township in Mitford parish. From 1866 Pigdon was a civil parish in its own right until it was merged with Meldon on 1 April 1955.

References 

Hamlets in Northumberland
Former civil parishes in Northumberland